The 2018–19 Primera División de El Salvador (also known as the Liga Pepsi) is the 20th season and 39th and 40th Primera División tournament, El Salvador's top football division, since its establishment of an Apertura and Clausura format. Alianza F.C. are the defending champions of both Apertura and Clausura tournaments. The league will consist of 12 teams. There will be two seasons conducted under identical rules, with each team playing a home and away game against the other clubs for a total of 22 games per tournament. At the end of each half-season tournament, the top eight teams in that tournament's regular season standings will take part in the playoffs.

The champions of Apertura or Clausura with the better aggregate record will qualify for the 2020 CONCACAF Champions League. The other champion, and the runner-up with the better aggregate record will qualify for the 2019 CONCACAF League. Should the same team win both tournaments, both runners-up will qualify for CONCACAF League. Should the final of both tournaments features the same 2 teams, the semifinalist with the better aggregate record will qualify for CONCACAF League.

Team information 

A total of 12 teams will contest the league, including 11 sides from the 2017–18 Primera División and 1 promoted from the 2017–18 Segunda División.

Dragon were relegated to 2018–19 Segunda División the previous season.

The relegated team was replaced by the 2017–18 Segunda División playoffs promotion winner. Jocoro F.C. won the Apertura 2017 and Clausura 2018 title, meaning there was no need for a promotion playoff and were promoted automatically.

Promotion and relegation 

Promoted from Segunda División de Fútbol Salvadoreño as of June, 2018.

 Champions: Jocoro F.C.

Relegated to Segunda División de Fútbol Salvadoreño as of June, 2018.

 Last Place: Dragon

Personnel and sponsoring

Notable events

Change of Ownership of Aguila
The Grupo Aguila Deportivo, SA de CV announced in June, 2018 that they were selling their operating rights for Aguila, on the 6th of July a new group under Adolfo Salume (Club Social Águila) had purchased Aguila from the Arieta group (Grupo Aguila Deportivo) for undisclosed fees.

Pasaquina and Audaz moving stadium
Pasaquina announced that due to their home stadium not meeting new CONCACAF standards and minimal crowd numbers, they would play their home games at La Union stadium. Audaz also announced that they would play some games away from Estadio Jiboa.

New ball sponsorship for the league
The league signed a new deal with Mexican company Voit to provide the balls used in the national league.

Change of Ownership of Audaz
The Audaz Apasteque group announced in January, 2018 that they were selling their operating rights for Audaz, on the 6th of July a new group under Roberto Campos had purchased Audaz from the Juan Pablo Herrera group for undisclosed fees.

Deduction of Points
Audaz attempted to play in unapproved jersey, despite on the spot modification being done, referee abandoned the game and FESFUT decided to award the match to a 2-0 forfeit win to Isidro Metapan.

On February 27, 2019 C.D. Municipal Limeno, Jocoro F.C. and C.D. Pasaquina were deducted six points due to failing to sign the right paperwork for their respective under 17 teams to compete in the tournament.

Notable death from Apertura 2018 season and 2019 Clausura season
The following people associated with the Primera Division have died in end of 2018 and mid 2019.

 David Antonio Platero
 Didier Gutiérrez
 Darwin Alcides Melgar
 José Vidal Hernández
 Mauricio Ernesto González
 Tulio Quiros

Managerial changes

Before the start of the season

During the Apertura season

Between Apertura and Clausura seasons

During the Clausura season

Apertura

League table

Results

Records 
 Best home records: Santa Tecla F.C. and Alianza F.C.  (27 points out of 33 points)
 Worst home records: C.D. Luis Angel Firpo  (6 points out of 33 points)
 best away records : Alianza F.C.  (22 points out of 33 points)
 worst away records : C.D. Luis Angel Firpo   (6 points out of 33 points)
 Most goals scored: Alianza F.C.  (44 goals)
 Fewest goals scored: C.D. Sonsonate  (16 goals)
 Fewest goals conceded : Alianza F.C.  (16 goals)
 Most goals conceded : C.D. Luis Angel Firpo (46 goals)

Top goalscorers

Scoring 

 First goal of the season:  Ronald Rodríguez for Aguila against Sonsonate, 9 minutes (July 28, 2018)
 First goal by a foreign player:  Joaquín Vergés for Aguila against Sonsonate, 36 minutes (July 28, 2018)
 Fastest goal in a match: 2 minutes
  Bladimir Diaz for Alianza against Chalatenango (September 17, 2018)
 Goal scored at the latest point in a match: 90 minutes
  Juan Barahona  goal for Santa Tecla  against Audaz (28 July 2018)
 First penalty Kick of the season:  Ricardinho for Santa Tecla against Audaz, 35 minutes (July 28, 2018)
 Widest winning margin: 5 goals
 Alianza 5–0 Luis Ángel Firpo (2018) 
 First hat-trick of the season: Christopher Ramirez for Luis Ángel Firpo against Isidro Metapán (August 18, 2018)
 First own goal of the season:  TBA (TBD) for TBD (February 19, 2018)
 Most goals in a match: 7 goals
 Luis Ángel Firpo 3-4 Isidro Metapán  (August 18, 2018)
 Most goals by one team in a match: 5 goals
 Alianza 5–0 Luis Ángel Firpo (2018) 
 Most goals in one half by one team: 4 goals
 FAS 4-0 (4–0) Luis Ángel Firpo  (2nd half, August, 2018)
 Most goals scored by losing team: 3 goals
 Jocoro  3–4 Municipal Limeño (September 15, 2018)
 Most goals by one player in a single match: 3 goals
  Christopher Ramirez for Luis Ángel Firpo against Isidro Metapán (August 18, 2018)
  Ulises Tavares for Sonsonate against Audaz (September, 2018)
  Clayvin Zúniga for Limeno against Jocoro (September 15, 2018)
  Rodolfo Zelaya for Alianza against Aguila (September, 2018)

Playoffs

Quarterfinals

First leg

Second leg 

Aguila won 4-3 on aggregate.

Santa Tecla won 3-2 on aggregate.

FAS won 2-0 on aggregate.

Alianza won 7-0 on aggregate.

Semifinals

First leg

Second leg 

Santa Tecla won 5-2 on aggregate.

2-2. Alianza advanced as the higher seeded team.

Final

Clausura

League table

Results

Records 
 Best home records: Alianza F.C.  (30 points out of 33 points)
 Worst home records: Jocoro F.C.  (5 points out of 33 points)
 Best away records : Alianza F.C.  (19 points out of 33 points)
 Worst away records :   C.D. Sonsonate   (6 points out of 33 points)
 Most goals scored: Alianza F.C.  (49 goals)
 Fewest goals scored: Jocoro F.C. and C.D. Luis Angel Firpo  (16 goals)
 Fewest goals conceded : C.D. Aguila  (14 goals)
 Most goals conceded : C.D. Sonsonate (39 goals)

Top goalscorers

Scoring 
 First goal of the season:  Joaquin Verges for Aguila against Jocoro, 4 minutes (13 January 2019)
 First goal by a foreign player:  Joaquin Verges for Aguila against Jocoro, 4 minutes (13 January 2019)
 Fastest goal in a match: 2 minutes
  Ivan Mancia for Alianza against Metapan (24 February 2019)
 Goal scored at the latest point in a match: 90+2 minutes
  Juan Jose Hernandez  goal for Jocoro against Santa Tecla (January 24, 2019)
 First penalty Kick of the season:  Joaquin Verges for Aguila against Jocoro, 4 minutes (13 January 2019)
 Widest winning margin: 5 goals
 Alianza 5–0 Firpo (February, 2019)
 First hat-trick of the season:  Bladimir Diaz for Alianza against Limeno (January 20, 2019)
 First own goal of the season:  TBA (TBD) for TBD (February 19, 2018)
 Most goals in a match: 8 goals
 Alianza 6-2 Audaz  (April 8, 2019)
 Most goals by one team in a match: 6 goals
 Alianza 6-2 Audaz  (April 8, 2019)
 Most goals in one half by one team: 3 goals
 Metapan 3-1 (3-3) Pasaquina (2nd half, January 24, 2019)  Alianza 3-0 (4-0) Limeno (2nd half, January 20, 2019)
 Most goals scored by losing team: 3 goals
 FAS 3–4 Sonsonate  (2019) 
 Most goals by one player in a single match: 4 goals
 Dustin Corea for FAS against Firpo (March 16, 2019)
 Players that scored a hat-trick': 
 Bladimir Diaz for Alianza against Limeno (January 20, 2019)
 Dustin Corea for FAS against Firpo (March 16, 2019)
 Bladimir Diaz for Alianza against Audaz (April 8, 2019)
 Ricardo Guevara for Aguila against Sonsonate (April 13, 2019)

Playoffs

Quarterfinals

First leg

Second leg 

4-4, Aguila won as highest seeded team.

Isidro Metapan won 3-2 on aggregate.

1-1, Limeno won as highest seeded team.

Alianza won 5-0 on aggregate.

Semifinals

First leg

Second leg 

Aguila won 4-0 on aggregate.

2-2, Alianza won as highest seeded team.

Final

Aggregate table

List of foreign players in the league 
This is a list of foreign players in the 2018–19 season. The following players:

 Have played at least one game for the respective club.
 Have not been capped for the El Salvador national football team on any level, independently from the birthplace

A new rule was introduced this season, that clubs can have four foreign players per club and can only add a new player if there is an injury or a player is released and it is before the close of the season transfer window. 

 (player released during the Apertura season)
 (player released between the Apertura and Clausura seasons)
 (player released during the Clausura season)

References 

Primera División de Fútbol Profesional seasons
El Salvador
1